CICU-FM is a Canadian radio station broadcasting at 94.1 MHz from the Eskasoni First Nation on Cape Breton Island in Nova Scotia. The station broadcasts a community radio format and plays a variety of music, including classic rock, country, etc.

The station received its license from the CRTC on December 23, 1993  and went on the air in 1994.

References

External links
CICU 94.1 FM 
 

ICU
Radio stations established in 1994
1994 establishments in Nova Scotia